Walter Jacob (born 1930) is an American Reform rabbi who was born in Augsburg, Germany, and immigrated to the United States in 1940.

He received his B.A. from Drury College (Springfield, Missouri, 1950) and ordination and an M.H.L. from Hebrew Union College in 1955.  He earned his D.H.L. in 1961 from HUC-JIR, which also granted him an honorary D.D. in 1975; he also received a D.D. from Drury College in 1990. Augsburg honored him with a special award in 2014.

Immediately following ordination, Jacob was named assistant rabbi at Rodef Shalom Congregation in Pittsburgh, Pennsylvania, under Rabbi Solomon Freehof. He served as a chaplain in the U.S. Air Force in the Philippines  during the years 1955–57. In 1966, Jacob succeeded Freehof as senior rabbi, becoming emeritus in 1997.  He was adjunct professor at the Pittsburgh Theological Seminary (1968–74).  In 1990 he along with a small group  re-established Liberal Judaism in Germany.  For several years he  served as the Honorary Liberal Rabbi of  Munich, Germany and in 1998 was co- founder of the Abraham Geiger College, the first rabbinic seminary in Central Europe since the Holocaust in Berlin/Potsdam.  He continues as its President and has ordained six classes.

Jacob founded and was the first chairperson of the [https://www.freehofinstitute.org/ Solomon B. Freehof Institute for Progressive Halakhah, an international forum for Jewish law, and of the Associated American Jewish Museums, which organizes free art exhibits for synagogues and Jewish centers. The Freehof Institute holds seminars in North America, Europe or Israel each year on Jewish law and has published 23 volumes on topics as diverse as War and Terrorism in Jewish Law, The Sexual Issues in Jewish Law, and The Internet Revolution and Jewish Law.  He took a leading role in interfaith dialogue with his book Christianity through Jewish Eyes (1974, 2007) which brought him into a close friendship with Cardinal John Wright and Cardinal Donald W. Wuerl.  He was president of the Religious Education Association of America (1981–85) Jacob served the Reform movement in the United States as president of the *Central Conference of American Rabbis (CCAR) (1991–93). His interest and expertise in Jewish law led him to serve as chairman of the Responsa Committee of the CCAR (1974–1990). and chairman of the International Responsa Committee of the World Union for Progressive Judaism (WUPJ) He served as president of the Religious Education Association of the United States (1981–85).  He and his wife (Irène Jacob) established the largest Biblical Botanical Garden in North America in 1986 and published in that field.  He also wrote on interfaith issues. Jacob served as overseer of HUC-JIR, Vice-President of the World Union for Progressive Judaism (1990–94), and chairman of the Publications Committee of Hebrew Union College Press (1976–1999).  As CCAR president, he emphasized  a broader Reform interpretation of the halakhah.  As the sixteenth generation of rabbis, he has continued the work of *Benno Jacob's biblical commentaries.

He was made a Knight Commander of the Federal Republic of Germany in 1999 and received the Commander of the Equestrian Order of St. Gregory the Great from Pope John Paul II in 2004.

Jacob has published 43 books and more than twelve hundred essays, sermons, and monographson a range of topics which include responsa, Jewish theology, biblical studies, interfaith dialogue, modern Jewish problems, and gardening together with his wife, Irene Jacob.

Selected works

Walter Jacob Christianity through Jewish Eyes New York, 1974, 1982, 287 pp.
The Changing World of Reform Judaism – The Pittsburgh Platform in Retrospect. 1985 
Liberal Judaism and Halakhah, A Symposium, 1988, 
  and Irène Jacob, The Healing Past, Pharmaceuticals in the Biblical and Rabbinic World, 1993, 
  and Irène Jacob, Gardens of North America and Hawaii – A Traveller's Guide, 1985, 
  and Benno Jacob, The Second Book of the Bible – Exodus interpreted by B. Jacob, translated and introduced, 1992, 
  with Moshe Zemer, Death and Euthanasia in Jewish Law, 1995,  
Fetus and Fertility in Jewish Law, 1995, 
Aging and the Aged in Jewish Law, 1998, IBN 0-929699-08-4
Israel and the Diaspora in Jewish Law, 1997, 
Crime and Punishment in Jewish Law, 1999, 
The Environment in Jewish Law, 2003, 1-57181-431-0
Poverty and Tzedakah in Jewish Law, 2006, 
War and Terrorism in Jewish Law, 2010, 
The Internet Revolution in Jewish Law, 2014,

References

1. An American Rabbinate – A Festscrhrift for Walter Jacob (Peter S. Nobel and Mark N. Staitman, editors, 2000.  Pittsburgh 
2.  Pursuing Peace Across the Alleghenies – The Rodef Shalom Congregation, Pittsburgh, Pennsylvania 1865–2005.  Walter Jacob, Editor.    
3.  “Abraham Geiger College:” Willkommen”
4.  Rodef Shalom Congregation – 150 Years of Living by Jewish Values.  2007, Pittsburgh PA.

1930 births
Living people
Jewish emigrants from Nazi Germany to the United States
American Reform rabbis
21st-century American Jews